Maria Eduarda Ferreira Sampaio (born 18 May 2001), known as Duda Sampaio or just Duda, is a Brazilian professional footballer who plays as a midfielder for Corinthians.

Club career
Born in Jequeri, Minas Gerais, Duda began her career with América Mineiro, making her senior debut in 2017. Ahead of the 2019 season, after already becoming a starter, she moved to Cruzeiro.

On 30 December 2021, Duda opted to leave Cruzeiro as her contract was expiring. The following 19 January, she signed for Internacional.

International career
After representing Brazil at under-20 level, Duda received her first call up for the full side on 2 September 2020, for a period of trainings. She made her international debut on 10 July 2022, coming on as a second-half substitute for Ary Borges in a 4–0 Copa América Femenina win over Argentina.

Career statistics

International

References

2001 births
Living people
Sportspeople from Minas Gerais
Brazilian women's footballers
Women's association football midfielders
Campeonato Brasileiro de Futebol Feminino Série A1 players
Brazil women's international footballers
Sport Club Internacional (women) players
Sport Club Corinthians Paulista (women) players